Nane Sarma ("Grandma Frost"), also known as Bibi Barfi ("Grandma Snow"), is a mythical character in Iranian folklore. She is the wife of Amu Nowruz, the "Uncle Nowruz".

In 2012, the first Iranian folktale of Nane Sarma was published in English, in the book Pomegranates and Roses: A Persian Love Story.

See also
 Snegurochka, a related character in Slavic countries, except that she is depicted as the granddaughter of Grandfather Frost, the local holiday gift-bringer.
 Deities and personifications of seasons

References

Nowruz
Iranian folklore
Iranian culture
Persian culture
Persian words and phrases
Holiday characters